Odontomachus haematodus is a species of trapjaw ant commonly referred to as two-spined trapjaw ant native to South America. It has since been introduced into the United States. The species typically nests in rotting wood, although in certain places the ant can nest within plants such as Aechmea aquilega. Workers forage both during the day and nocturnally, relying on the fast snapping of their jaws. It is a known predator of Thoropa taophora tadpoles.

References

Ponerinae
Ants described in 1758
Taxa named by Carl Linnaeus
Hymenoptera of South America